Kaunas State Puppet Theatre is a puppet theatre in Kaunas, Lithuania. The professional theatre was established in 1958. Each theatrical season it offers to the spectators twenty puppet performances, and 4–5 new plays are usually staged. There are two halls for spectators – 226 and 50 seats each in the theatre. Small museum of puppets characters  is set at the premises of theatre. The theatre performed plays in festivals of many foreign countries.

External links
Kaunas State Puppet Theatre website

Theatres in Kaunas
1958 establishments in Lithuania
Performing groups established in 1958